Hratch is an Armenian given name. Notable people with the name include:

 Hratch Kozibeyokian (born 1951), Armenian American distinguished expert of oriental rugs
 Hratch Zadourian (born 1969), Lebanese former racing cyclist

See also
 Hatch (disambiguation)

Armenian masculine given names